Yevgeni Viktorovich Pankov (born 24 November 1983) is a former Russian professional footballer.

External links
 
 

1983 births
Living people
Russian footballers
Association football defenders
Russian expatriate footballers
Expatriate footballers in Belarus
FC Dinamo Minsk players
FC Granit Mikashevichi players
FC Minsk players
FC Zhemchuzhina Sochi players
FC Dynamo Stavropol players
FC Slavia Mozyr players
Belarusian Premier League players
FC Spartak-MZhK Ryazan players
FC Dynamo Makhachkala players
FC Spartak Nizhny Novgorod players